Jervonte Edmonds (born June 11, 1991) is an American politician. He serves as a Democratic member for the 88th district of the Florida House of Representatives.

Edmonds was born in Titusville, Florida. He attended Florida Atlantic University, where he earned his bachelor's degree in 2015. He settled in West Palm Beach, Florida. In 2022, Edmonds was elected for the 88th district of the Florida House of Representatives against Guarina Torres. He succeeded Omari Hardy. Edmonds assumed office on March 8, 2022.

References 

1991 births
People from Titusville, Florida
Democratic Party members of the Florida House of Representatives
21st-century American politicians
21st-century African-American politicians
20th-century African-American people
Florida Atlantic University alumni
Living people